The 2019 SEC women's soccer tournament was the postseason women's soccer tournament for the SEC. The LSU Tigers were the defending champions, but they were unable to defend their title after not qualifying for the 2019 tournament.. The South Carolina won the tournament title with a 1–0 win over the Arkansas Razorbacks in the final.  This was the second SEC women's soccer tournament title for South Carolina, and the second for coach Shelley Smith.

Qualification 

The top ten teams earned a berth into the SEC Tournament. The tournament is held at Orange Beach Sportsplex in Orange Beach, Alabama.

Bracket

Source:

Schedule 

All matches are played at Orange Beach Sportsplex in Orange Beach, Alabama.

First Round

Quarterfinals

Semifinals

Final

Statistics

Goalscorers

All-Tournament team

Source: 

MVP in bold

See also 

 Southeastern Conference
 2019 NCAA Division I women's soccer season
 2019 NCAA Division I Women's Soccer Tournament

References 

2019 Southeastern Conference women's soccer season
2019 NCAA Division I women's soccer season
2019